Tri-Valley League may refer to:

 Tri-Valley League (CIF), California
 Tri-Valley League (MIAA), Massachusetts